Sandersdorf is a village and a former municipality in the district of Anhalt-Bitterfeld, in Saxony-Anhalt, Germany. Since 1 July 2009, it is part of the town Sandersdorf-Brehna. It is situated approximately 5 km west of Bitterfeld, and 27 km northeast of Halle (Saale).

It is the birthplace of German author Johann Gottfried Schnabel.

References

Former municipalities in Saxony-Anhalt
Sandersdorf-Brehna

ro:Sandersdorf